Alpha Kappa Psi sorority operated in the United States from 1900 to approximately 1920. At dissolution, several chapters joined Delta Delta Delta.

Early history
On March 1, 1900, Alpha Kappa Psi was founded as the first Greek letter sorority on the campus of Saint Mary's School in Raleigh, North Carolina. Rev. Theodore DuBose Bratton, eventual bishop of Mississippi (1903), assisted his students with the creation. The purpose was to "foster the highest ideals of Christian womanhood" (Saint Mary's Archives). The first initiation was held in 1901.

Two other Greek lettered literary societies were also founded on campus in 1900: Epsilon Alpha Pi, and Sigma Lambda.

Going National 
In 1904, AKP was incorporated as a national sorority. Soon, other chapters were chartered. Beta chapter was chartered at Virginia Female Institute (Stuart Hall) in Staunton, Virginia. The next eight years were the "heyday" of the sorority. Chapters were chartered at schools in Florida, Georgia, South Carolina, Washington DC, and Pennsylvania. The Alpha chapter disbanded in 1911, when rector Dr. George W. Lay abolished all sororities at Saint Mary's. The Beta chapter existed for only five years, 1904- 1909.

Moderate Success
Baird's Manual of American College Fraternities (1912) categorized  with "other women's general fraternities", such as Alpha Chi Omega and Alpha Omicron Pi. Seven active chapters were listed at this stage, with total active sisters at 304. Three conventions took place previous to this Baird's edition.

The 1915 publication of Baird's categorized the sorority in the "second division" of women's fraternities. Within a few years, a distinction would be made between the senior status sororities and junior status sororities that had been emerging, as a way of distinguishing nationals that were smaller or which served non-accredited colleges. At the time of publication of this issue,  now had five active chapters and five inactive chapters, with a total membership of 377. Two chapters left to affiliate with Delta Delta Delta (Baird's 1915, p. 464).

Demise
Alpha Kappa Psi, a Junior College Sorority as of 1916, granted releases to chapters at Four Year Colleges that chose to affiliate with a larger national. These included Wesleyan Female College, Florida State College for Women, and Stetson University. By 1920, the sorority was recategorized as one of the "Miscellaneous Fraternities" in Baird's Manual. Four remaining active chapters were listed:

Fairmont Seminary (Monteagle, Tennessee)
Carnegie Institute of Technology
Gunston Hall (Washington, DC)
Synodical College (Fulton, MO)

The sorority had an approximate total of 487 members (Baird's 1920, p. 675)

Although the date of national dissolution is unknown, Alpha Kappa Psi dispersed sometime after 1920.  Over its short history at least three chapters joined Delta Delta Delta sorority.

Conventions
The following conventions were held

Asheville 1909
Atlanta 1910
Charleston 1911
Jacksonville 1912
Washington, DC 1914

Chapters
Chapters of Alpha Kappa Psi:

Alumnae Associations
Alumnae Associations of Alpha Kappa Psi:

Tampa Alumnae
Atlanta Alumnae
Camden Alumnae
Savannah Alumnae
Portsmouth Alumnae
Macon Alumnae

Insignia
There are two different descriptions of the badge. The first, from Saint Mary's Archive, which describes the badge (1909)as "an equilateral triangle bearing in the angles of the Greek letters". The 1912 and 1915 publications of Baird's described the badge as "a triangle divided into three panels, one displaying a scroll carrying a skull and bones, one a key and the third a torch"
The official publication was the Trigonon
The colors were blue and gold, specifically sky blue and gold
The flower was the forget-me-not
The official symbol, circa 1909, was the skull and bones (Saint Mary's Archives).
The open motto was "Ever Upward"

References

 Baird's Manual of American College Fraternities, Editions 1912, 1915, 1920, and 1991.
 Saint Mary's School, Kenan Library Collection, Part 1, Series 3: Organizations
 Box 47: Alpha Kappa Psi; Box 48: Epsilon Alpha Pi; Box 49: Sigma Lambda.
 https://web.archive.org/web/20090129133142/http://saint-marys.edu/pages/sitepage.cfm?page=54688
 https://web.archive.org/web/20150519002634/https://sororityhistories.wordpress.com/2015/05/13/alpha-kappa-psi-history-through-alpha-chapter/

Fraternities and sororities in the United States
Defunct fraternities and sororities
Student organizations established in 1900
1900 establishments in North Carolina